Toxic Zombies (also known as Bloodeaters, Bloodeaters: Butchers of the Damned, The Dromax Derangement, and Forest of Fear) is a 1980 horror film directed by Charles McCrann, who also acted in the film. It was classified as a video nasty in the United Kingdom in the 1980s.

Plot 

Illegal drug plantations are sprayed with the chemical Dromax by passing aeroplanes in an anti-drug initiative organised by corrupt government officials. Instead of killing the plants, the hippie growers of the crop are turned into flesh eating zombie-like creatures.

Cast 
 Charles McCrann (credited as Charles Austin) - Tom Cole 
 Beverly Shapiro - Polly Cole
 Dennis Helfend - Hermit
 John Amplas - Phillips

Production 

The film was produced in the late 1970s while McCrann, who was a graduate of Princeton University and Yale Law School and senior vice president at Marsh & McLennnan, was on hiatus.

Release and controversy 

The film was given a limited release theatrically in the United States by Parker National Distributing. It was also shown twice on the USA Network.

Toxic Zombies is one of the films labelled a video nasty and was banned in the United Kingdom in the 1980s.

Reception 

According to McCrann's wife Michelle, the film "epitomized (his) sense of humor".

Leonard Maltin qualified the film as a "bomb". The film was also panned in Cinefantastique.  Writing in The Zombie Film Encyclopedia, academic Peter Dendle said, "Despite inconsistent behavior patterns and embarrassing acting, Toxic Zombies has the dubious honor of inaugurating the entire 'redneck zombie' subgenre that would thrive inexplicably in the '80s."

McCrann would later work for Marsh & McLennan and was killed in their World Trade Center offices during the September 11 attacks.

References

External links 

1980 films
1980s exploitation films
1980 horror films
American zombie films
American exploitation films
American films about cannabis
Video nasties
1980s English-language films
1980s American films